Abdelrahman Hesham (born 1992) is an Egyptian chess player. He was awarded the title Grandmaster by FIDE in 2016.

Career 
Hesham won the 2016 African Chess Championship, earning him the title of Grandmaster.

He has also represented Egypt in two Chess Olympiads. In 2016, he played on board 5, ending on 5.5/9. In 2018, he played on board 4, finishing on 4.5/9.

References

External links

Abdelrahman Hesham games at 365Chess.com

1992 births
Living people
Chess grandmasters
Egyptian chess players
Chess Olympiad competitors
Place of birth missing (living people)
Competitors at the 2019 African Games
African Games medalists in chess
African Games gold medalists for Egypt